198 riders in 22 teams commenced the 1997 Tour de France. 139 riders finished.

The 16 teams with the highest UCI ranking at the start of 1997 were automatically qualified.

Teams

Qualified teams

Invited teams

Cyclists

By starting number

By team

By nationality

References

1997 Tour de France
1997